The 17007 / 17008 Secunderabad–Darbhanga Express is a Superfast Express trains in India train belonging to South Central Railway zone that runs between  and  in India. It is currently being operated with 17007/17008 train numbers on bi-weekly basis. The train was cancelled due to closure of Dhanbad–Chandrapura line.
As the train service between Dhanbad & Chandrapura line is resumed  this train is restored & will follow it's Older route From 2 July 2019 as 17007 Secunderabad Darbhanga Express and from 5 July 2019 as 17008 Darbhanga Secunderabad Express with slightly modified timetable

Service

The 17007/Secunderabad–Darbhanga Express has an average speed of 51 km/hr and covers 1917 km in 39h 5m. The 17008/Darbhanga–Secunderabad Express has an average speed of 52 km/hr and covers 1917 km in 39h 5m.

Route & Halts 

The important halts of the train are:

Coach composition

The train has standard ICF rakes with a max speed of 110 kmph. The train consists of 21 coaches:

 2 AC II Tier
 4 AC III Tier
 10 Sleeper coaches
 5 General Unreserved
 2 Seating cum Luggage Rake

Traction

This route is now electrified, both trains are hauled by a Lallaguda-based WAP-7 or Vijayawada-based WAP-4 locomotive from Secunderabad Junction till Darbhanga and vice versa.

Rake sharing 

The train shares its rake with 12769/12770 Tirupati–Karimnagar Superfast Express, 12761/12762 Seven Hills Express & 17001/17002 Secunderabad–Sainagarshirdi Express.

See also 

 Darbhanga Junction railway station
 Dhanba–Chandrapura line
 Secunderabad Junction railway station
 Seven Hills Express
 Tirupati–Karimnagar Superfast Express

Notes

References

External links 

 17007/Secunderabad–Darbhanga Express India Rail Info
 17008/Darbhanga–Secunderabad Express India Rail Info

Transport in Darbhanga
Transport in Secunderabad
Defunct trains in India
Rail transport in Telangana
Rail transport in Maharashtra
Rail transport in Chhattisgarh
Rail transport in Jharkhand
Rail transport in Bihar
Railway services introduced in 2012